TMPad (the TransMembrane Protein Helix-Packing Database) is a repository of helix-helix interactions in membrane proteins

See also
 Alpha helix
 membrane protein

References

External links
 http://bio-cluster.iis.sinica.edu.tw/TMPad

Biological databases
Helices
Membrane proteins
Protein structural motifs